MSCC is a four-letter acronym, and may refer to:

 Marine Science Co-ordination Committee
 Metastatic spinal cord compression
 Microsemi Corporation
 Mid-South Community College
 Middle School Cadet Corps
 Motlow State Community College